Alfredo Malerba (24 September 1909 in Rosario – 9 January 1994 in Mexico) was an Argentine pianist and musician, producer and screenwriter, with an illustrious career. He wrote tangos such as Besos brujos, Te lloran mis ojos, Canción de cuna, Cuando el amor muere, Un amor, Cosas del amor and Vendrás alguna vez.

He was married to Libertad Lamarque from 24 December 1945 until his death in 1994.

Filmography
 1936: Ayúdame a vivir
 1937: La ley que olvidaron
 1937: Besos brujos
 1938: Madreselva
 1938: Puerta cerrada
 1939: La vida de Carlos Gardel, donde se lo puede ver en el film.
 1939: Caminito de gloria
 1940: Cita en la frontera
 1941: Una vez en la vida
 1970: Rosas blancas para mi hermana negra
 1972: La sonrisa de mamá
 1978: La mamá de la novia

References

Argentine pianists
Male pianists
Argentine musicians
Male screenwriters
Argentine film producers
1909 births
1994 deaths
20th-century pianists
20th-century Argentine screenwriters
20th-century Argentine male writers